Chuck Winfrey is a former linebacker in the National Football League. Winfrey played the 1971 NFL season with the Minnesota Vikings. The following season, he was a member of the Pittsburgh Steelers.

References

Players of American football from Chicago
Minnesota Vikings players
Pittsburgh Steelers players
American football linebackers
Wisconsin Badgers football players
1949 births
Living people